Global Banking and Finance Awards was started in 2011 by the United Kingdom based Global Banking & Finance Review magazine to recognize notable changes happening in the global financing community. The awards are presented annually and they reflect the innovative, progressive, and inspirational changes taking place within the global financial sector, including banking, corporate finance, Islamic finance, inward investment, tax and accounting, asset management, mergers and acquisitions.

Award Recipients

References

External links 
Official Website

Business and industry awards
Innovation
Entrepreneurship